The Leopard for Best Actor is an award given at the Locarno International Film Festival. It was first awarded in 1946.

Award winners

References

External links
 

Locarno Festival
Swiss film awards
Lists of films by award